Oscar Rodriguez Jr. is an American football coach and former player. He is currently a defensive analyst for the Kansas Jayhawks football team. He served the interim head football coach at the University of Akron, replacing Tom Arth, who was fired on November 4, 2021.

Playing career
Rodriguez attended Liberal High School in Liberal, Kansas. He began his college career in 2001 at Emporia State University in Emporia, Kansas. He transferred to Coffeyville Community College in Coffeyville, Kansas, for the 2002 season, before finishing out his career at Fort Hays State University in Hays, Kansas.

Head coaching record

External links
 Kansas profile

Year of birth missing (living people)
Living people
Akron Zips football coaches
Baker Wildcats football coaches
Chattanooga Mocs football coaches
Coffeyville Red Ravens football players
Emporia State Hornets football coaches
Emporia State Hornets football players
Fort Hays State Tigers football players
Garden City Broncbusters football coaches
Hutchinson Blue Dragons football coaches
La Verne Leopards football coaches
Kansas Jayhawks football coaches
Washburn Ichabods football coaches
High school football coaches in Texas
People from Liberal, Kansas
Coaches of American football from Kansas
Players of American football from Kansas